Bailey Peacock-Farrell (born 29 October 1996) is a professional footballer who plays as a goalkeeper for  club Burnley. Born and raised in England, he plays international football for Northern Ireland.

Peacock-Farrell played in Middlesbrough's youth system before signing for Leeds United in 2013. He signed his first professional contract in June 2015 and made his first-team debut in April 2016. He went on loan to National League North club York City in October 2017. Peacock-Farrell broke into the Leeds first team late into the 2017–18 season and made his debut for the Northern Ireland national team in May 2018. He started the 2018–19 season as Leeds' first-choice goalkeeper before losing his place to Kiko Casilla in January 2019. Peacock-Farrell signed for Premier League club Burnley in August 2019. He spent the 2021–22 on loan at League One club Sheffield Wednesday.

Club career

Leeds United

Early career

Peacock-Farrell was born in Darlington, County Durham. He started his career in Middlesbrough's youth system in 2006 before being released in 2013, when the club chose not to offer him a scholarship. He joined Leeds United shortly after and signed his first professional contract with the club in June 2015. Following Marco Silvestri's dismissal in an away match against Rotherham United on 2 April 2016, Peacock-Farrell made his first-team debut in a Championship match at home to Queens Park Rangers on 5 April. The match finished a 1–1 draw, in which he conceded an 87th-minute penalty kick. Peacock-Farrell signed a new two-year contract at Leeds on 9 June. In October, he was ruled out with injury, after surgery on a broken hand.

Peacock-Farrell signed a new three-year contract at Leeds on 9 July 2017. He joined League One club Oldham Athletic on trial for the beginning of pre-season with the view to a season-long loan move, although Oldham decided not to take up the option. He returned to pre-season with Leeds, competing with Andy Lonergan and Felix Wiedwald. Peacock-Farrell joined National League North club York City on 12 October on a one-month loan. He made his debut two days later in a 2–2 draw away to Leamington. He made four appearances for York, in which he conceded nine goals, returning to Leeds once the loan expired. Peacock-Farrell joined Swedish Superettan club Landskrona BoIS on a three-day trial in January 2018. After training and playing an internal friendly match for the team, Landskrona decided not to sign him.

Nearly two years after making his debut, Peacock-Farrell played his second match for Leeds on 7 March 2018 at home to league leaders Wolverhampton Wanderers, with first-choice goalkeeper Wiedwald dropped due to poor form. Leeds lost 3–0, but Peacock-Farrell received the man-of-the-match award for his performance. He retained his place in the team for the following matches and became Leeds' first-choice goalkeeper for the remainder of the 2017–18 season. He put in several man-of-the-match performances, including a 1–0 defeat against Aston Villa, after which Dan Long of Sky Sports wrote that Peacock-Farrell "looks incredibly assured between the sticks, particularly astounding given his age". In May, Peacock-Farrell won the Young Player of the Year award at Leeds' annual award ceremony. He finished the season with 11 appearances for Leeds as they finished in 13th place in the 2017–18 Championship.

2018–19
After beating off competition from new signing Jamal Blackman, Peacock-Farrell started the 2018–19 season in goal under new head coach Marcelo Bielsa. His understudy Blackman returned to parent club Chelsea with an injury in November, leaving Peacock-Farrell as Leeds' only senior goalkeeper. After Bielsa publicly revealed that Peacock-Farrell would have been dropped the following match had Blackman not been injured, Peacock-Farrell became the match winner on 27 November, saving a 90th-minute penalty against Reading to help Leeds to a 1–0 win.

Leeds signed goalkeeper Kiko Casilla from Real Madrid on 17 January 2019 to compete with Peacock-Farrell for a starting place. He dropped to the bench against Rotherham United on 26 January, with Casilla establishing himself as the club's first-choice goalkeeper. Bielsa stated that he believed that taking Peacock-Farrell out of first-team action would help his development. However, he did return for a single match later in the season on 30 March, for the suspended Casilla, in a 3–2 home win over Millwall. Leeds qualified for the play-offs with a third-place finish in the 2018–19 Championship, and Peacock-Farrell was an unused substitute in both legs of the semi-final as Leeds were beaten 4–3 on aggregated by Derby County. During the 2018–19 season, Peacock-Farrell made 29 appearances in all competitions.

In June 2019, Peacock-Farrell revealed he had turned down the option of starting pre-season training a week later after featuring on international duty for Northern Ireland, in order to compete for the goalkeeping position with Casilla. Peacock-Farrell had previously stated that he would be reluctant to sign a new contract with Leeds should he continue to be second choice in goal. However, assurances of a first-team place were not forthcoming as the 2019–20 season approached, with Casilla still preferred in goal by Bielsa.

Burnley
Peacock-Farrell signed for Premier League club Burnley on 2 August 2019 on a four-year contract with the option of a further year for an undisclosed fee, reported by BBC Sport as £2.5 million. He was signed to provide competition with Joe Hart and Nick Pope after the departure of Tom Heaton. On 28 November 2020, Peacock-Farrell made his league debut for Burnley in 5–0 away defeat against Manchester City.

Peacock-Farrell joined Sheffield Wednesday on 27 July 2021 on a season-long loan. He made his debut on 1 August 2021, at home to Huddersfield Town in the first round of the 2021–22 EFL Cup, keeping a clean sheet in a 0–0 draw after extra time, although the team would eventually lose in a penalty shoot-out. He would become the first ever goalkeeper for Sheffield Wednesday not to concede in the opening five games of the season, keeping clean sheets against Huddersfield Town, Charlton Athletic, Doncaster Rovers, Fleetwood Town and Rotherham United, including a spectacular penalty save in the later game. His form did not go unnoticed by the fanbase and he was named the club's Player of the Month for August as well as being nominated by the EFL for Player of the Month for August. He would win Wednesday's Player of the Month again for December, which would see a clean sheet against Portsmouth and his fourth penalty save for club and country of the season, against Crewe Alexandra.

International career

Peacock-Farrell qualified for Northern Ireland as his grandfather, Jim Farrell, was from Enniskillen. He was called up to the Northern Ireland national team in May 2017 for a training camp. In August, he was called up for 2018 FIFA World Cup qualification matches against San Marino and Czech Republic. Peacock-Farrell was called up the Northern Ireland U21 squad in March 2018 by manager Ian Baraclough for their matches against Spain and Iceland in 2019 UEFA European Under-21 Championship qualification. He made his debut on 26 March, keeping a clean sheet as Northern Ireland played out a 0–0 draw with Iceland.

After impressing as Leeds' first-choice goalkeeper, Peacock-Farrell was named in the Northern Ireland squad in May 2018 ahead of friendlies against Panama and Costa Rica. He made his debut on 30 May against Panama as a half-time substitute in a 0–0 draw. Peacock-Farrell revealed in September that he had been approached by members of the England national team staff about the possibility of changing his allegiance, which he would be able to do since he had not yet made his competitive debut for Northern Ireland. Peacock-Farrell, however, affirmed his wish to represent Northern Ireland, who had shown interest in him at an early stage. He made his competitive debut for Northern Ireland on 8 September, starting in a 2–1 home defeat to Bosnia and Herzegovina in the 2018–19 UEFA Nations League.

Career statistics

Club

International

Honours
Individual
Leeds United Young Player of the Year: 2017–18

References

External links

Profile at the Burnley F.C. website
Profile at the Irish Football Association website

1996 births
Living people
Footballers from Darlington
English footballers
Association footballers from Northern Ireland
Association football goalkeepers
Leeds United F.C. players
York City F.C. players
Burnley F.C. players
Sheffield Wednesday F.C. players
English Football League players
National League (English football) players
Premier League players
Northern Ireland under-21 international footballers
Northern Ireland international footballers
English people of Northern Ireland descent